Mike McCourt is a TV journalist working at Citytv outlet CKAL-TV in Calgary, Alberta, Canada. He co-hosted the local CBWT local news program 24Hours in Winnipeg from 1987 to 1992. He was also the main ABC correspondent during the Israeli invasion of Lebanon in 1982.

References

External links
 - Mike McCourt's CITY TV bio

Canadian television journalists
Year of birth missing (living people)
Living people